Siavonga is a constituency of the National Assembly of Zambia. It covers Siavonga and surrounding areas in Siavonga District of Southern Province.

List of MPs

References 

Constituencies of the National Assembly of Zambia
1973 establishments in Zambia
Constituencies established in 1973